Acacia kerryana is a shrub belonging to the genus Acacia and the subgenus Juliflorae that is endemic to south western Australia.

Description
It has flexuose branchlets that are slightly ribbed and usually lightly covered with stiff sharp hairs. It blooms from October to February producing yellow flowers. The simple inflorescences occur in pairs or in groups of three in the axils.

Taxonomy
The species was first formally described by the botanist Bruce Maslin in 1982 as part of the work Studies in the genus Acacia (Leguminosae: Mimosoideae). Two new species from the eastern goldfields, Western Australia as published in the journal Nuytsia. It was reclassified as Racosperma kerryanum by Leslie Pedley in 2003 then transferred back to genus Acacia in 2006.

Distribution
It is native to an area in the southern Goldfields region of Western Australia where it is found on plains and low rocky ridges growing in granitic loamy sands or clay sand soils. The species has a scattered distribution between Kambalda in the north down to around Norseman in the south where it is usually found as a part of low open shrubland communities.

See also
 List of Acacia species

References

kerryana
Acacias of Western Australia
Plants described in 1982
Taxa named by Bruce Maslin